The Circle Chart, previously known as the Gaon Music Chart or the Gaon Chart, tabulates the relative weekly popularity of songs and albums in South Korea. It is produced by the Korea Music Content Association and sponsored by South Korea's Ministry of Culture, Sports and Tourism. Founded in 2010.

History 

Gaon Chart was launched in February 2010 by the Korea Music Content Association, under the sponsorship of the South Korean Ministry of Culture, Sports and Tourism, with the aim to create a domestic national chart similar to the Billboard charts of the United States and the Oricon charts of Japan. The word gaon, which means "middle" or "center" in Korean, was chosen to represent fairness and reliability. The chart started tracking sales from the beginning of that year. A small awards ceremony was held in conjunction with the launch ceremony on February 23, at the Westin Chosun hotel in Seoul. Girl group Girls' Generation was awarded the Top Artist of January, boy band Super Junior won Best Album of 2009, and Jo Kwon and Ga-in's "We Fell In Love" won Best Weekly Mobile Ringtone.

In February 2011, Gaon published online and offline album sales information for 2010, including a detailed breakdown of online chart data. This was the first time that offline album sales had been released since 2008 when the Music Industry Association of Korea stopped compiling data.

On July 7, 2022, the Gaon Chart was rebranded as Circle Chart. A new Global K-pop Chart was introduced alongside the retention of existing charts. The Gaon Chart Music Awards were also rebranded to the Circle Chart Awards.

Music charts

Song charts

Album charts

Other music charts

Social charts
The Circle Social Chart is a weekly chart that ranks the top 50 most popular K-pop artists using data from YouTube, TikTok, Mubeat, and Mycelebs.

The Gaon Weibo Chart was a weekly chart that ranked the top 10 most popular K-pop groups and the top 30 most popular individual K-pop artists in China using data from Weibo.

Certification

In April 2018, Korea Music Content Association introduced music recording certifications for albums, downloads and streaming. Album certifications are awarded based on shipment figures provided by record labels and distributors. Download and streaming certifications are awarded to songs based on online data provided by web-based music providers. Albums and songs released on or after January 1, 2018, are eligible for certification.

Album

Download

Streaming

Awards
Circle Chart Music Awards

See also

References

Notes

External links 
 Circle Chart homepage 
 (Former) Gaon chart official homepage 
 KMCA official homepage 

Internet properties established in 2010
Music organizations based in South Korea
South Korean record charts